GJR may refer to:

Transport 
 Gjögur Airport, serving Árneshreppur district, Iceland
 Grand Junction Railroad, in the Boston, Massachusetts, area
 Grand Junction Railway, an early railway company in England
 Grand Junction Railway (Ontario), a defunct railway company in Canada
 Guelph Junction Railway, in Guelph, Ontario, Canada

Other uses 
 George Junior Republic, a residential treatment center in Freeville, New York
 George Junior Republic (Pennsylvania), a residential treatment center near Grove City, Pennsylvania
 Gurindji Kriol language
 G. J. R. Krishnan, Indian violinist